The 1996 Florida Bobcats season was the fifth season for the Florida Bobcats, and the first under that name. They finished the 1996 Arena Football League season 6–8 and were one of four teams in the National Conference to miss the playoffs.

Regular season

Schedule

Standings

References

Florida Bobcats seasons
1996 Arena Football League season
Florida Bobcats Season, 1996